= Wadral =

- Village
- Location in Karnataka, India Wadral (India)
- Coordinates: 16°21′9″N 74°32′3″E
- Country: India
- State: Karnataka
- District: Belgaum

Languages
  - Official: Kannada
- Time zone: UTC+5:30 (IST)

Wadral is a village in Belgaum district in the southern state of Karnataka, India.
